Darius D'Souza (born 11 October 1989) is an Indian born Canadian cricketer. D'Souza is a right-handed batsman who bowls right-arm off spin. He was born in Bombay (today Mumbai), Maharashtra.

D'Souza played for Canada Under-19s in the 2010 Under-19 World Cup in New Zealand, making five Youth One Day International appearance during the tournament. While studying for his degree in Computer Science & Business in England at Loughborough University, D'Souza made his first-class debut for Loughborough MCCU against Northamptonshire in 2011.

References

External links
Darius D'Souza at ESPNcricinfo
Darius D'Souza at CricketArchive

1989 births
Living people
Cricketers from Mumbai
Indian emigrants to Canada
Alumni of Loughborough University
Canadian cricketers
Loughborough MCCU cricketers